Zerlina may refer to:
 Zerlina Maxwell, American cable television host, political analyst, commentator, speaker, and writer
 Zerlina, role in the opera Don Giovanni
 asteroid 531 Zerlina